Karlshamn Power Station (also known as Stärnö Power Station) is an oil-fired thermal power station on Stärnö peninsula west of Karlshamn. It has had three units, each with a generation capacity of 340 MW, which went in service in 1969, 1971 and 1973. Unit 1 was closed in 2015.
The units feed 400 kV grid, but are only utilized as reserve power during shorter periods.  Next to the power station, a converter station of the SwePol HVDC submarine cable is located.

External links 

 https://www.uniper.energy/sverige/reservkraft/karlshamnsverket

Oil-fired power stations in Sweden
Karlshamn Municipality